The 10th Government of Slovenia and the second one of Janez Janša was announced on 10 February 2012. It was formed after the 2011 Slovenian parliamentary election. It was the second government of Janez Janša, and so he became the second premier to return to the position, after Janez Drnovšek, who was Prime minister four times.

On 5 January 2012, President Danilo Türk proposed Zoran Janković as the candidate to form a government to the National Assembly. Two days before the scheduled voting, the Slovenian Association of Journalists and Commentators, the second largest journalists' association in the country, issued a statement raising the concern that Janković might abuse his power as Prime Minister by curtailing the freedom of media through intimidation. A coalition agreement between PS, SD, DL and DeSUS was initialled on 7 January. However, in the evening of 9 January, DL announced it would not support Janković as the new Prime Minister and also not join his coalition, due to large differences in the programs of the parties. On 11 January, Janković was not elected as the new Prime Minister by the National Assembly. In a secret ballot, his candidacy only gained the support of 42 deputies, two less than expected prior to the voting, and four short of the absolute majority needed for his election. Following the election of Janez Janša as the Prime Minister in the second round of the voting, Positive Slovenia became an opposition party.

Janša's second government did not finish its mandate. The trouble began when Commission for the Prevention of Corruption of the Republic of Slovenia (KPK) published a report of control of the assets of each president of Slovenian parliamentary parties. Janez Janša and Zoran Janković did not know how to explain the source of all of their assets

Cabinet members came from five parties of the new coalition, until SLS, DL and DeSUS left the coalition on 23 January 2013:

Slovenian Democratic Party (SDS) - 4 Ministers - 6 Ministers at the end of the term
New Slovenia (NSi) - 1 Minister + 1 Minister without portfolio
Gregor Virant's Civic List (DL) - 2 Ministers - Left coalition with resignation of both ministers on 23 January 2013
Democratic Party of Pensioners of Slovenia (DeSUS) - 2 Ministers -  Left coalition on 23 January 2013 but both ministers stayed on positions
SLS - 2 Ministers -  Left coalition on 23 January 2013 but both ministers stayed on positions

Changes from the preceding cabinet
The number of ministries was reduced from 19 in the Pahor cabinet to 12, due to the crisis. It was the fourth government led by the centre-right party.

List of ministers and portfolios

Composition at the end of the mandate

Former members

See also

2011 Slovenian parliamentary election
Prime Minister of Slovenia
Government of Slovenia
 List of governments of Slovenia
Commission for the Prevention of Corruption of the Republic of Slovenia

References

External links
Official website of the Slovenian Government
Chronology of Slovenian cabinets at vlada.si 

Jansa 02
2012 establishments in Slovenia
2013 disestablishments in Slovenia
Cabinets established in 2012
Cabinets disestablished in 2013